Kikou Seiki Unitron (機甲世紀ユニトロン) (English: Armor Chronicles Unitron) is a video game. It was released in 2000 for the Neo Geo Pocket Color handheld game console. It is the sequel to Biomotor Unitron. It was only released in Japan.

Gameplay 
The game takes place 400 years after Biomotor Unitron. Kikou Seiki Unitron plays similar to Biomotor Unitron with top down dungeons and menu-based combat. The game requires the player to upgrade their unitron robot with various weapons and accessories to compete against various enemies within the dungeon areas. Using a link cable two players can pit their unitrons against each other in a head-to-head battle.

External links
 Kikou Seiki Unitron at MobyGames
 Kikou Seiki Unitron at GameFAQs

2000 video games
Neo Geo Pocket Color games
Japan-exclusive video games
Role-playing video games
Video games developed in Japan